Newfield, New Field, Newfields, or variant, may refer to:

Facilities and structures
 New Field, a cricket ground in Winchester, Hampshire, England
 Newfield Bridge, a covered bridge in Newfield, New York, USA
 Newfield Hall, a hotel and former manor in North Yorkshire, England
 Newfield High School, Seiden, New York State, USA
 Newfield Park, Bridgeport, a park in Connecticut, USA
 Newfield Park, Johnstone, a soccer grounds in Renfrewshire, Scotland, UK
 Newfield Primary School, Whitfield, Dundee, Scotland, UK
 Newfield Secondary School, Sheffield, South Yorkshire, England, UK
 Newfields, the museum campus that houses the Indianapolis Museum of Art, Indiana, USA

People
 Alexa Newfield (born 1991), U.S. soccer player
 Heidi Newfield (born 1970), U.S. country music singer
 Jack Newfield (1938-2004), U.S. journalist
 Marc Newfield (born 1972), U.S. baseball player
 Morris Newfield (1869-1940), Hungarian-American rabbi
 Sam Newfield (1899-1964), U.S. film director

Places

United Kingdom
 Newfield, Bishop Auckland, County Durham, England
 Newfield, Chester-le-Street, County Durham, England
 Newfield, Staffordshire, a location in the UK
 Newfield, Highland, Scotland

United States
 Newfield, Arizona, Pima County
 Newfield, Maine
 Newfield (Willowbrook) Historic District, an NRHP-listed district
 Newfield, New Jersey
 Newfield, New York
 Newfield Hamlet, New York
 Newfield Township, Michigan
 Newfields, New Hampshire, a New England town
 Newfields (CDP), New Hampshire, the main village in the town

See also

 Newfield Green, an area in Sheffield, Yorkshire, England, UK
 Newfield, County Durham (disambiguation)
 Newfield Park (disambiguation)
 Newfield School (disambiguation)
 Field (disambiguation)
 New (disambiguation)